Čadež is a Slovene surname. Notable people with the surname include:
Andrej Čadež (born 1942), Slovene physicist and astrophysicist
Boštjan Čadež (born 1979), Slovene intermedia artist
Luka Čadež (born 1987), Slovenian former competitive figure skater

Slovene-language surnames